Arnulf II of Boulogne (died 972) was Count of Boulogne from 964 to 972. He was the son of Count Adelolf of Boulogne. He succeeded as count in 964 after the death of his uncle Arnulf I, who was also Count of Flanders, and held it until his own death. He is the father of Arnulf III, Count of Boulogne, who succeeded him as Count of Boulogne. He is the ancestor of the Godfrey of Bouillon and Baldwin I, Kings of Jerusalem.

972 deaths
10th-century French people
Counts of Boulogne
House of Flanders
Year of birth unknown